Sa Piling ni Nanay (International title: Ysabel / ) is a Philippine television drama series broadcast by GMA Network. Directed by Gil Tejada Jr. and Omar Deroca, it stars Yasmien Kurdi, Katrina Halili and Mark Herras. It premiered on June 27, 2016 on the network's Afternoon Prime line up replacing The Millionaire's Wife. The series concluded on January 27, 2017 with a total of 154 episodes. It was replaced by Pinulot Ka Lang sa Lupa in its timeslot.

The series is streaming online on YouTube.

Premise
Ysabel is a single mother to Maymay. Working as a personal assistant to Scarlet, who married Javier for money. Scarlet is incapable to give her husband a child and convinces Javier to get a surrogate mother, Ysabel. Scarlet knows Ysabel needs money because Maymay has leukemia. Maymay later dies while Ysabel is still pregnant who will become the kid of Scarlet and Javier, Maya. Due to sadness, Ysabel will take away Maya and she will raise her like her own daughter.

Cast and characters

Lead cast
 Yasmien Kurdi as Ysabel Salvacion-de Guzman / Zeny Alfonse
 Mark Herras as Jonas Ocampo
 Katrina Halili as Scarlet Morato-Mercado

Supporting cast
 Nova Villa as Matilda Mercado 
 Bettina Carlos as Wanda
 Antonio Aquitania as Victor "Rod" Alfonse
 Sofia Catabay as Maya de Guzman / Katharine Mercado-Salvacion
 Benjamin Alves as Javier Mercado

Guest cast
 Chlaui Malayao as Angelica Mae "Maymay" Salvacion
 Dexter Doria as Almeda "Meding" Alfonse
 Chinggoy Riego as Juaning
 Banjo Romero as Budong
 Rap Fernandez as Diaz
 David Licauco as David 
 Jaycee Parker as Patty Morato 
 Nicole Dulalia as Denise 
 Dianne Hernandez as Sofia 
 Patricia Ysmael as Greta 
 Milkcah Wynne Nacion as Sarah Alfonse
 Zarah Mae Deligero as young Sarah
 Aprilyn Gustillo as Mayca Pineda
 Shermaine Santiago as Joy Villegas
 Jillian Ward as Katherine Salvacion
 Gabby Eigenmann as Benedict Corpuz
 Irma Adlawan as Remy Santel
 Diva Montelaba as Rose 
 Lance Busa as Mocha
 Nikki Co as Michael
 Judie dela Cruz as Mira

Ratings
According to AGB Nielsen Philippines' Mega Manila household television ratings, the pilot episode of Sa Piling ni Nanay earned a 15.4% rating. While the final episode scored a 10.7% rating.

Accolades

References

External links
 
 

2016 Philippine television series debuts
2017 Philippine television series endings
Filipino-language television shows
GMA Network drama series
Television shows set in the Philippines